The Living and the Dead may refer to:

 The Living and the Dead (2006 film), a British drama by Simon Rumley
 The Living and the Dead (2007 film), a Croatian war movie by Kristijan Milic
 The Living and the Dead (album), a 2008 album by Jolie Holland
 The Living and the Dead (Boileau-Narcejac novel), a 1954 novel by Pierre Boileau and Pierre Ayraud
 The Living and the Dead (White novel), a 1941 novel by Patrick White
 The Living and the Dead (Simonov novel), a 1959 novel by Konstantin Simonov
 The Living and the Dead (TV series), a British supernatural drama television series
 The Living and the Dead: Robert McNamara and Five Lives of a Lost War, a 1996 book by Paul Hendrickson

See also 
 The Alive and the Dead, a 1964 Soviet film by Alexander Stolper